FC SKA-Lotto Odesa was a Ukrainian football club from Odesa, Odesa Oblast.

League and cup history

{|class="wikitable"
|-bgcolor="#efefef"
! Season
! Div.
! Pos.
! Pl.
! W
! D
! L
! GS
! GA
! P
!Domestic Cup
!colspan=2|Europe
!Notes
|}

External links
 FC SKA-Lotto Odesa on allplayers.in.ua

 
Defunct football clubs in Ukraine
Football clubs in Odesa
Association football clubs established in 1995
Association football clubs disestablished in 1998
1995 establishments in Ukraine
1998 disestablishments in Ukraine